Kurtul is a village in the Gemlik district of Bursa Province in Turkey.

References

Villages in Gemlik District